Pedro Nieves (born 27 February 1961) is a Venezuelan boxer. He competed in the men's light flyweight event at the 1980 Summer Olympics. At the 1980 Summer Olympics, he defeated Singkham Phongpratith of Laos, before losing to Dietmar Geilich of East Germany.

References

1961 births
Living people
Venezuelan male boxers
Olympic boxers of Venezuela
Boxers at the 1980 Summer Olympics
Place of birth missing (living people)
Light-flyweight boxers